Shorea havilandii is a tree in the family Dipterocarpaceae, native to Borneo. It is named for the English naturalist George Darby Haviland.

Description
The bark is flaky to cracked.

Distribution and habitat
Shorea havilandii is endemic to Borneo.

Conservation
Shorea havilandii has been assessed as least concern on the IUCN Red List and is considered abundant although declining in population. There are some threats to the species, including conversion of land for intensive agriculture, such as palm oil plantations. The species is also threatened by logging for its timber. Shorea havilandii does occur in a number of protected areas.

References

havilandii
Endemic flora of Borneo
Plants described in 1895